Wilmington Air Park  is a public-use airport located two nautical miles (3.7 km) southeast of the central business district of Wilmington, a city in Clinton County, Ohio, United States. While DHL had privately owned the property while operating from the facility, the company agreed to donate the airfield to the Clinton County Port Authority.

The airport was formerly known as Clinton County Air Force Base.

History
The airport opened in 1929 and a small hangar was built in 1930. The landing strip was approved by the Civil Works Administration in 1933. In 1940, the Civil Aeronautics Authority took control of Wilmington Airport for use as an emergency landing field. In 1942, the United States Army Air Forces took over the airport, renaming it Clinton County Army Air Field. With the establishment of an independent U.S. Air Force in 1947, the installation was renamed Clinton County Air Force Base and primarily supported Air Force Reserve flight operations and training under the 302d Troop Carrier Wing  (1952-67), which then became the 302d Tactical Airlift Wing and briefly the 302d Special Operations Wing (1967-71).

The base was decommissioned as an Air Force installation in 1972 and the Community Improvement Corporation (CIC) began developing the area as the Wilmington Industrial Air Park (WIAP). It also became home to the Great Oaks Joint Vocation School. In 1977, the Southern State Community College opened, using old barracks buildings as classrooms. In 1980, Midwest Air Charter was acquired by Airborne Freight Corporation, resulting in Airborne Express, which became the largest tenant at WIAP.

In 2003, as part of the merger of DHL and Airborne, DHL kept Airborne's ground operations and spun off its air operations as ABX Air. The facility was a major sorting center for package delivery service DHL Express between 2005 and the sorting center's closing in July 2009, following then Deutsche Post-owned DHL's cessation of US domestic delivery services.

On August 7th, 2022 one person died and 8 first responders were injured when an automatic fire foam suppression system deployed inside one of the Air Transport and Service Group aircraft hangars.

Facilities and aircraft
It has two concrete surfaced runways: 04L/22R is 10,701 by 150 feet (3,262 x 46 m) and 04R/22L is 9,000 by 150 feet (2,743 x 46 m).

For the 12-month period ending December 31, 2006, the airport had 71,000 aircraft operations, an average of 194 per day: 96% scheduled commercial and 4% general aviation.

Future of the property

On January 19, 2010, DHL agreed to turn over the airport, including its two runways, control tower, buildings and cargo storage facilities to the Clinton County Port Authority. The donation became effective on June 2, 2010. While no concrete plans were set, the port authority plans to work with local and state officials on redeveloping the property.

A comprehensive Redevelopment Study for the Wilmington Air Park was completed in December 2011.

In January 2012, the Clinton County Port Authority was in conversations with the Ohio Air National Guard for the possible return of a U.S. Air Force presence at the airport, with possible use as a joint civil-military airfield by the Air National Guard to operate model specific Unmanned Aerial Vehicles (UAV)

Project Aerosmith and Amazon Air
After years of dormancy, cargo activity resumed during second half of 2015. Operated under the code name Project Aerosmith, Wilmington-based Air Transport Services Group was performing a trial run for a potential Amazon.com air cargo operation. In December 2015, Amazon announced that frustration with third-party carriers had led to them investigating their own cargo operation to be flown potentially by ATSG, Atlas Air, or Kalitta Air. As part of a trial, five ATSG Boeing 767s were being operated from Wilmington to airports near Amazon distribution centers, with 219 flights operated between November 1 and December 17, 2015, in contrast to seven in the previous period the year before.

In March 2016, Amazon announced leases for 20 767s with its Wilmington operations to be supported by ATSG and its subsidiaries including Air Transport International, which served as Amazon's primary carrier.  In this announcement, Amazon received options to purchase up to 19.9 percent of ATSG stock, exercisable over a five-year period.

In January 2017 Amazon announced it would shift flight operations to Cincinnati/Northern Kentucky International Airport (CVG) alongside a major expansion of service. The move was finalized on April 30, 2017, when the last Amazon flight departed. Despite the shift to CVG appearing to be the end of Amazon service at ILN, it was announced in November 2018 that ILN would again open for Amazon so that capacity demands could be met during construction of the company's sort facility at CVG, with operations resuming in June 2019.

Airlines and destinations

Cargo

References

External links

 

Airports in Ohio
Buildings and structures in Clinton County, Ohio
Airfields of the United States Army Air Forces in Ohio
Airfields of the United States Army Air Forces Technical Service Command
Transportation in Clinton County, Ohio